The Fleet Submarine Force belonged to the surface force for the self-defense fleet of the Maritime Self-Defense Forces. It is a fleet organized around submarines belonging to the Self-Defense Fleet of the Japan Maritime Self-Defense Force.

History 
On 1 February 1965, the 1st Submarine Group was newly formed under the Self-Defense Fleet.  On 16 October 1973, the 2nd Submarine Group was newly formed under the Self-Defense Fleet.  On 10 February 1981, the Submarine Fleet was newly formed under the Self-Defense Fleet (Headquarters, 1st Submarine Group, 2nd Submarine Group, Submarine Education and Training Corps).

On 9 March 2000, a new edition of the 1st Training Submarine. Initially, the submarines belonged in the group were JDS Asashio and JDS Setoshio. On 22 March 2002, the Yokosuka Submarine Education and Training Detachment was newly established in the Submarine Education and Training Corps.  On 1 October 2020, the Submarine Fleet Command moved to the new Maritime Operations Center, a new government building of the Self-Defense Fleet Command completed in the Funakoshi area.

Gallery

Citations

External links 

 Submarine Fleet
Diving Team’s Preparation 
Practice Diving Team’s Preparation Instructions
The preparation of the submarine base team
The preparation of the submarine education and training team

Japan Maritime Self-Defense Force
Naval history of Japan